Goodmayes railway station is on the Great Eastern Main Line serving the district of Goodmayes in the London Borough of Redbridge, east London. Its three-letter station code is GMY, and it is in Travelcard Zone 4.

The station was opened in 1901 by the Great Eastern Railway.

History

These in turn were replaced by Class 315 units from 1980.

In 2017 new  trains entered operation on the Shenfield – London Liverpool Street route as the new Crossrail service partially opened. The station also received three new lifts providing access to all platforms, improved lighting and signage, help points, and new ticket machines and gates within a refurbished ticket hall.

Services
After electrification in 1949 an even off-peak service pattern of three trains each way per hour evenly spaced was introduced. Over 30 years later the pattern had not altered significantly so that in 1984 there were:
These trains all originated from 

Down trains ran at 17, 37 and 57 minutes past the hour Mondays-Saturdays between 05:17 and 23:37 with additional trains in the rush hour. On Sundays the trains ran at 19 and 49 minutes past the hour.

Up trains ran at 06, 26 and 46 minutes past the hour Mondays-Saturdays between 05:06 and 23:46 with additional trains in the rush hour. On Sundays the trains ran at 16 and 46 minutes past the hour.

Today all services from Goodmayes are operated by Elizabeth line. From 6 November 2022 the frequency and calling points are:

 8 tph to Shenfield calling at Chadwell Heath, Romford, Gidea Park, Harold Wood, Brentwood and Shenfield.
 8 tph to Paddington calling at Seven Kings, Ilford, Manor Park, Forest Gate, Maryland, Stratford, Whitechapel, Liverpool Street, Farringdon, Tottenham Court Road, Bond Street and Paddington

From May 2023 the full timetable will be introduced, with some services travelling beyond Paddington to Heathrow Terminal 5.

Yards and connections
There was an extensive freight yard for goods traffic on the down side of the line which extended from the station building a consideable distance towards . This was a busy yard with a signal box controlling movements, and after 1900 a turntable and water tower were added, and part of the yard was given over to Permanement Way maintenance. The yard closed in 1962 and after the tracks were removed the land was grassed until replaced by a supermarket, other shops and housing.

At the end of the 19th Century a short line extended from the eastern end of the of the yard and curved away under the High Road to a gravel pit. This line was still extant in 1914 but had been removed by 1938 when housing covered the area.

Early in the 20th Century a large yard was constructed on the up side of the line extending as far as Kinfauns Road. Associated with this was the Becontree Estate Railway which built to transport materials that were used in construction of the Becontree Estate, although this was removed after construction of the estate was completed.

Connections
London Buses routes 364 and EL3 serve the station.

References

Citation

References

External links

 Excel file displaying National Rail station usage information for 2005/06 

Railway stations in the London Borough of Redbridge
Former Great Eastern Railway stations
Railway stations in Great Britain opened in 1901
Railway stations served by the Elizabeth line
1901 establishments in England
Railway stations